James Joe Childs (born August 9, 1956) is an American former professional football wide receiver who played two seasons in the National Football League (NFL) for the St. Louis Cardinals. He played college football at Cal Poly.

Early career 
Childs graduated from La Puente High School in California.

College career 
Standing 6-foot-2, Childs played receiver for Cal Poly San Luis Obispo.

Professional career 
Childs was selected in the fourth round of the 1978 NFL Draft, chosen with the 97th overall pick by the St. Louis Cardinals.

In two seasons with the Cardinals (1978 and 1979), Childs caught a combined 12 passes for 143 yards and one touchdown, starting twice amongst his 21 career games played. He also returned four kickoffs for 77 total yards during his second season.

His only professional touchdown came in the third quarter of a 16-6 loss to the New England Patriots on September 10, 1978, as he caught an 8-yard scoring pass from Jim Hart.

References 

1956 births
Living people
American football wide receivers
Cal Poly Mustangs football players
St. Louis Cardinals (football) players
Chicago Bears players
People from El Dorado, Arkansas
Players of American football from Arkansas